Johannes Radebe (born 27 April 1987) is a South African dancer and choreographer.

Early life
Radebe was born in Zamdela. He is gay, and has spoken out about the homophobic bullying he received as a child. He and his sister attended a dance school in their local area. At the age of 11, he was offered dance training in Gauteng province, and he attended secondary school in the Johannesburg suburb of Ennerdale.

Career
Radebe has  won the Professional South African Latin championships twice and has been the Amateur Latin South African champion three times.

Radebe was a professional dancer on South Africa's version of Strictly Come Dancing in 2014 on SABC 3 and Dancing with the Stars in 2018 on M-Net. In 2018, the BBC announced that Radebe would join the cast of professional dancers on the British Strictly Come Dancing, although he was not allocated a partner in his first series. In 2021, Radebe was announced as a contestant on Celebrity MasterChef.

In 2022, he choreographed the West End-themed Rusical on RuPaul's Drag Race: UK vs the World.

Highest and Lowest Scoring Per Dance

Performances with Catherine Tyldesley
For his first competitive appearance in this show, in the seventeenth season series, he was partnered with actress Catherine Tyldesley. The couple were eliminated in week 6, placing them in 11th place, with an overall average score of 25.5.

 *Score awarded by guest judge Alfonso Ribeiro

Performances with Caroline Quentin
For series 18, he was partnered with actress, Caroline Quentin.

 *Score awarded by guest judge Anton Du Beke

Performances with John Whaite
For series 19, he was partnered with chef, John Whaite. They are the first male same-sex pairing in the history of the UK format. The couple reached the final, where they finished as Runners-Up to winners Rose Ayling-Ellis, and her partner Giovanni Pernice. 

 number indicates when John and Johannes were at the top of the leaderboard.
 *Score awarded by guest judge Cynthia Erivo.

Performances with Ellie Taylor
For series 20, he was partnered with comedienne, Ellie Taylor.

 number indicates when Ellie and Johannes were at the top of the leaderboard.
  number indicates when Ellie and Johannes were at the bottom of the leaderboard.

Tours

References

Living people
1987 births
South African male dancers
South African gay men
Gay dancers
LGBT choreographers